Al-Bilad is the name of

 Al Bilad (Bahraini newspaper)
 Al-Bilad (Saudi newspaper)
 Al Bilad Bank, a bank in Saudi Arabia
 Al-Bilad, Yemen, a village in Yemen